Plagiognathus albatus is a species of plant bug in the family Miridae. It is found in North America.

Subspecies
These three subspecies belong to the species Plagiognathus albatus:
 Plagiognathus albatus albatus (Van Duzee, 1915)
 Plagiognathus albatus vittiscutis Knight, 1923
 Plagiognathus similis similis

References

Further reading

 

Plagiognathus
Articles created by Qbugbot
Insects described in 1915